Tawhitokino Regional Park is a regional park situated in the Auckland Region of New Zealand's North Island. It is owned and operated by Auckland Council.

References 

Franklin Local Board Area
Parks in the Auckland Region
Regional parks of New Zealand
Tourist attractions in the Auckland Region